Albania's news industry covers the press, television and radio.

The Albanian national news agency is the Albanian Telegraphic Agency (ATA), which uses the English language, as well as the Albanian language.

The press

Newspapers
The following newspapers are most published in Albania:

Private newspapers
Gazeta Shqiptare (daily)
Koha Jonë (daily)
Korrieri (daily)
Panorama (daily)
Shekulli (daily)
Shqip (daily)
Gazeta 55 (daily)

Political newspapers
Rilindja Demokratike (Democratic Party)
Zeri i Popullit (Socialist Party)

Websites
A2 News | CNN Exclusive News Channel Affiliate (Albanian language)
Albanian Daily News (English language)
Balkan Web (Albanian language)
NOA Agency (Albanian language, English language, Italian language and Greek language)
ATA (Albanian Telegraphic Agency, English language, Albanian language and French language)
Lezha Online (Lezha Online News, Albanian language)
Kombetare Online (Gazeta Kombetare Online, Albanian language)
AlbNews Portal (Latest news from Albania, Kosovo and Macedonia)

Television
Albania has four television networks:

Public
Albanian Radio Television (RTSH) (Public broadcaster that operates two networks)

Private
Top-Channel (Private network)
TVA (Private network)
TV Klan (Private network)

Radio
Albania has three radio networks:

Public
Radio Tirana (RTSH) (Public broadcaster)

Private
+2 Radio
Top Albania Radio

References
BBC World Media Profiles

External links
 Studi on Albanian Newspapers

References